Mária Saáry (born 17 March 1928) was a Hungarian figure skater. She competed in the ladies' singles event at the 1948 Winter Olympics.

References

1928 births
Possibly living people
Hungarian female single skaters
Olympic figure skaters of Hungary
Figure skaters at the 1948 Winter Olympics
Figure skaters from Budapest